Positive displacement may refer to:

 Positive displacement pump
 Positive displacement meter
 Positive displacement pipette